Isle of Man is an island located in Cataraqui River, in Frontenac County, Ontario, Canada.  It is actually not an island per se, because it has a land link to the eastern side of the river.  It is located northeast of Kingston.

See also
List of islands of Ontario

References

River islands of Ontario